Wolf Ridge Ski Resort is a ski area in the eastern United States in western North Carolina, near Mars Hill. Five miles (8 km) from Interstate 26, it has fifteen ski slopes and trails, with four of the slopes rated for beginners, nine 'intermediate', and only two as 'advanced'. The slopes are accessed by two carpet lifts two chairlifts: one quad chair and one double chair.

Typical of North Carolina ski areas, Wolf Ridge relies primarily on snowmaking for its slopes. As of January 2013, Wolf Ridge has been under new management.

Maps
Trail Map

External links

Skisoutheast.com

Buildings and structures in Madison County, North Carolina
Ski areas and resorts in North Carolina
Tourist attractions in Madison County, North Carolina